Novomykolaivka is an urban-type settlement, located in Zaporizhzhia Raion of Zaporizhzhia Oblast in Ukraine, although it was formerly administered within Novomykolaivka Raion. It is located on the right bank of the Verkhnia Tersa, a tributary of the Vovcha in the drainage basin of the Dnieper. Population:

Economy

Transportation
The settlement is on Highway H15 connecting Zaporizhzhia and Marinka and previously going to Donetsk.

The closest railway station is in Vilniansk, on the railway connecting Zaporizhzhia and Synelnykove.

People from Novomykolaivka 
 Vitold Fokin (born 1932), first prime minister of Ukraine

References

Urban-type settlements in Zaporizhzhia Raion